The 2nd Home Counties Division was a 2nd Line Territorial Force division of the British Army in World War I.  The division was formed as a duplicate of the 44th (Home Counties) Division in November 1914. As the name suggests, the division recruited in the Home Counties, particularly Kent, Middlesex, Surrey and Sussex.  In August 1915, in common with all Territorial Force divisions, it was numbered as 67th (2nd Home Counties) Division.  Between September 1917 and the end of the year, the division was extensively reorganized and lost its territorial identity; henceforth it was known as 67th Division.

It served on home defence duties throughout the war, whilst recruiting, training and supplying drafts to overseas units and formations.  It was twice warned to prepare to be transferred to Ireland, and in April 1917 for service on the Western Front, but in the event never left England.  It was eventually disbanded in March 1919.

History
In accordance with the Territorial and Reserve Forces Act 1907 (7 Edw. 7, c.9) which brought the Territorial Force into being, the TF was intended to be a home defence force for service during wartime and members could not be compelled to serve outside the country. However, on the outbreak of war on 4 August 1914, many members volunteered for Imperial Service.  Therefore, TF units were split into 1st Line (liable for overseas service) and 2nd Line (home service for those unable or unwilling to serve overseas) units.  2nd Line units performed the home defence role, although in fact most of these were also posted abroad in due course.

On 15 August 1915, TF units were instructed to separate home service men from those who had volunteered for overseas service (1st Line), with the home service personnel to be formed into reserve units (2nd Line).  On 31 August, 2nd Line units were authorized for each 1st Line unit where more than 60% of men had volunteered for overseas service.  After being organized, armed and clothed, the 2nd Line units were gradually grouped into large formations thereby forming the 2nd Line brigades and divisions.  These 2nd Line units and formations had the same name and structure as their 1st Line parents.  On 24 November, it was decided to replace imperial service (1st Line) formations as they proceeded overseas with their reserve (2nd Line) formations.  A second reserve (3rd Line) unit was then formed at the peace headquarters of the 1st Line.

The formation of the 2nd Home Counties Division was expedited as its parent Home Counties Division had been posted to India on 30 October 1914.  As a result, the division was formed in November 1914 with the 2nd Surrey, 2nd Middlesex and 2nd Kent Brigades as a 2nd Line duplicate and concentrated around Windsor.  Officers and men of the 1st Line infantry battalions and artillery brigades who did not go to India also joined the 2nd Line.

Throughout 1915, training was hampered by a lack of modern arms and equipment.  Further complicating the situation, in July 1915, the 2nd Line units and formations became liable for overseas service and were extensively reorganized; the home service personnel were posted to home service units.  Initially, the artillery were equipped with some obsolete French 90mm guns and the infantry with Japanese .256" rifles.

Order of battle

February 1918
In February 1918, 200th Brigade was demobilised and replaced by 214th Special Brigade transferred from 71st Division. This brigade had been reorganised and filled with men of A1 medical category for overseas service, with additional units attached to it for service at Murmansk as part of the  North Russia Intervention. However, this move never happened and the brigade joined 67th Division after 71st Division was disbanded on 12 February 1918:

214th Special Brigade
 2/7th Bn, Durham Light Infantry
 16th (Home Service) Bn, Queens (Royal West Surrey)
 252nd Machine-Gun Company, Machine-Gun Corps (MGC)
 253rd Machine-Gun Company, MGC
 2/1st Warwickshire Yeomanry  (Cyclist)
 2/1st Hertfordshire Yeomanry (Cyclist)
 XLIX Brigade, RFA
 494th (Home Counties) Field Company, RE
 71st Divisional Signal Company, RE

Commanders
The 67th (2nd Home Counties) Division had the following commanders:

See also

 44th (Home Counties) Division for the 1st Line formation
 List of British divisions in World War I

Notes

References

Bibliography
 
 
 
 
 Col L.F. Morling, Sussex Sappers: A History of the Sussex Volunteer and Territorial Army Royal Engineer Units from 1890 to 1967, Seaford: 208th Field Co, RE/Christians–W.J. Offord, 1972.

External links
 Chris Baker, The Long, Long Trail
 The Regimental Warpath 1914–1918 (archive site)

Infantry divisions of the British Army in World War I
Military units and formations established in 1914
Military units and formations disestablished in 1919
1914 establishments in the United Kingdom